Demerval Peixoto (11 December 1884 – 1962) was a Brazilian sports shooter. He competed in two events at the 1920 Summer Olympics.

References

External links
 

1884 births
1962 deaths
Brazilian male sport shooters
Olympic shooters of Brazil
Shooters at the 1920 Summer Olympics
People from São Fidélis
Sportspeople from Rio de Janeiro (state)